The Stephen Ball House (also known as Old Ball Mansion) is a historic house located on Main Street in Berkshire, Tioga County, New York.

Description and history 
It is a Greek Revival style temple form frame house built in about 1849. The house is a two-story, four bay wide house with a four pier portico and single story rear wing.

Stephen Ball was the son of Josiah Ball and an early settler of the area. He lived in Berkshire at least since 1808. Stephen Ball was a local land owner and in 1833 sold the plot for the church just north of this home. Ball ran a local brickyard and owned a local tavern.

The home has remained in the Ball family at least until 1980. The home was listed on the National Register of Historic Places on July 2, 1984.

References

Houses on the National Register of Historic Places in New York (state)
Greek Revival houses in New York (state)
Houses completed in 1849
Houses in Tioga County, New York
1849 establishments in New York (state)
National Register of Historic Places in Tioga County, New York